Penicillium coralligerum is a species of the genus of Penicillium. It is a marine species sometimes referred to as a deep-sea fungus and in some languages named the equivalent of "deep-sea mold".

See also
List of Penicillium species

References 

coralligerum
Fungi described in 1962